Marshlands Plantation House, in Charleston, South Carolina, is an historic plantation house that was built in 1810 and listed in the National Register of Historic Places on March 30, 1973. It is a -story Federal-style plantation home. The house was relocated in the 1960s from its original location on the site of the United States Navy Shipyard. The Navy had announced it would have to demolish the empty house if it could not be relocated with the $15,000 the Navy had set aside for the purpose. The City of Charleston took temporary possession of the house, transferring it to the College of Charleston which relocated it for preservation to James Island.

References

External links

Houses completed in 1810
Historic American Buildings Survey in South Carolina
Houses on the National Register of Historic Places in South Carolina
Federal architecture in South Carolina
Buildings and structures in North Charleston, South Carolina
National Register of Historic Places in North Charleston, South Carolina
Houses in Charleston, South Carolina
Plantation houses in South Carolina
College of Charleston
Relocated buildings and structures in South Carolina
1810 establishments in South Carolina